NOCL may refer to:

 Proudman Oceanographic Laboratory
 NOCl, the chemical formula for Nitrosyl chloride
NOCL- Nagarjuna Oil Corporation Limited